GDA may refer to:

 Generic Design Assessment, UK assessment process for new nuclear reactor designs
 Global Development Alliance, a program of the United States Agency for International Development
 GNU Data Access, a software API specification
 Golden Disc Awards, an annual South Korean major music awards ceremony
 Gounda Airport, in the Central African Republic
 Grand Democratic Alliance, a political alliance in Pakistan
 Greater Dublin Area, a region of Ireland
 Grupo de Diarios América, an international trade organization
 Guideline Daily Amount in the United Kingdom
 Gwadar Development Authority, in Gwadar, Pakistan
 GDA (gene), which encodes the enzyme guanine deaminase